Koovagam is  a village in the Ulundurpettai taluk in Kallakurichi district, Tamil Nadu. It is famous for its annual festival of transgender and transvestite individuals, which takes fifteen days in the Tamil month of Chitrai (April/May).

The festival takes place at the Koothandavar Temple dedicated to Iravan (Koothandavar). The participants marry the Lord Koothandavar, thus reenacting an ancient history of Lord Vishnu/Krishna who married him after taking a form of a woman called Mohini. The next day, they mourn the god Koothandavar's death through ritualistic dances and by breaking their bangles. An annual beauty pageant and several other competitions like singing contests are held.

Basic rights of transgender and transvestite individuals and health care are discussed in seminars too. People from different places attend this festival.

Location From Viluppuram 25 km and from Ulundurpet 15 km.

See also 
 Tamil sexual minorities

References

External links

Transgender topics and religion
Villages in Kallakurichi district
LGBT events in India
LGBT and Hinduism
Gender and Hinduism